Variations on a Theme of (by) Paganini may refer to:

 Variations on a Theme by Paganini by Sergei Aslamazyan
 Fantasy Variations on a Theme by Niccolò Paganini by James Barnes
 Variations on a Theme by Paganini by Boris Blacher
 Variations on a Theme by Paganini by Hans Bottermund
 Variations on a Theme of Paganini, Op. 35 by Johannes Brahms
 Variations on a Theme by Niccolò Paganini by Søren Nils Eichberg
 Thème de Paganini varié, Op. 1 by Stephen Heller
 Variations on a Theme of Paganini by Joseph Horovitz
 Variations on a Theme by Paganini by Gary Kulesha
 Variations on a Theme by Paganini by Witold Lutosławski
 Variations on a Theme by Paganini by Pavel Necheporenko
Variations on a Theme by Paganini by Marc-André Hamelin
 Nine Variants on Paganini by Frank Proto
 Paganini Variations by Poul Ruders
 Paganini Variations by Fazıl Say
 Variations on a Theme by Paganini by George Thalben-Ball
 Paganini Variations by Philip Wilby
 Variations (Andrew Lloyd Webber album)

See also 
 Fantasia for piano in C major "Souvenir de Paganini" by Johann Nepomuk Hummel
 Grandes études de Paganini by Franz Liszt
 Rhapsody on a Theme of Paganini by Lowell Liebermann
 Rhapsody on a Theme of Paganini, Op.43 by Sergei Rachmaninoff
 Souvenir de Paganini by Frédéric Chopin

Composer tributes (classical music)
Niccolò Paganini